Suba Theraniyo, theatrically as Jivakambavanika Hewath Suba Theraniyo, is a 2019 Sri Lankan Sinhala Buddhist epic biographical film directed by Sumith Kumara and co-produced by Bisara Chanakya and Ananda Samarasinghe for S.A.S Entertainments. It stars Ruwangi Rathnayake and Roshan Ranawana in lead roles along with Sriyantha Mendis and Dilhani Ekanayake. Music composed by Rohana Weerasinghe. It is the 1331st Sri Lankan film in the Sinhala cinema.

The film was released on Vesak Poya Day and to celebrate the 1562nd Sambuddhatva jayanthiya. The film has been screened in some Buddhist temples as well. The film was shown free for children under the age of 12.

Plot
The film is based on the life of prominent Buddhist nun Subha who delivered 34 Therigathas.

Cast
 Ruwangi Rathnayake as Suba Therani 'Suba'		
 Roshan Ranawana as Nanda		
 Sriyantha Mendis as Suba's father	
 Dilhani Ekanayake	as Sumana, Suba's mother	
 Mahinda Pathirage	as Dheeraka
 Udayanthi Kulatunga as Nandaa		
 Nimal Pallewatte as Nanda's father
 Thilini Perera as Suparna
 Kumara Wanduressa
 Manik Perera
 Ranjith Naotunna as Astrologer
 Ashika Mathasinghe as Maha Therani

Songs
The film consists with two songs.

References

External links
 
 වෙසක් සමයට සුභා තෙරණියෝ

2019 films
2010s Sinhala-language films
Films about Buddhism
Buddhist nuns